Brachytron is a monotypic genus of European dragonfly of the family Aeshnidae containing the hairy dragonfly (Brachytron pratense), also known as the hairy hawker or spring hawker.

Description
The hairy dragonfly is named for its hairy thorax, distinguishing it from other hawkers. It has a long, narrow pterostigma (the coloured, sclerotized patch on the outer region of each wing).

The antehumeral stripes are usually thin and green. The hairy dragonfly has coupled, oval-shaped markings on its abdomen, blue on males and yellow on females. It is smaller than other species in the genus Aeshna. It is the United Kingdom's smallest hawker.

Habitat
The hairy dragonfly lives in ponds, lakes, fens, ditches, and canals rich in vegetation. Some plants that grow there include the common club rush, common reed, great fen sedge, and true bulrush. This dragonfly requires open and sunny areas with dense vegetation for protection. Here they are able to feed on flying insects, shelter, and grow sexually mature.

Although it is a common species, it is susceptible to uncongenial ditch management and poor water conditions. This is the reason the species disappeared for a few years, only to return recently. More so then its other relatives, the hairy dragonfly will only fly in sunshine and will hastily retreat if the sun happens to go in.

Food and feeding habitats
Like typical hawkers, the hairy dragonfly preys in mid-air on flying insects. It then carries its food to a suitable perch where it is able to eat and digest.

Life stages
The hairy dragonfly's flight period is short and early, beginning in mid-May and ending in mid-July. Dead vegetation and living stems growing in the water, close to the water's edge, provide a home for the eggs. Two years later, larvae emerge by scaling plant stems just above the surface of the water or possibly crawling inland for about a meter where they have room to spread their wings.

Notes
 Hairy dragonfly. LWT (Lincolnshire Wildlife Trust). 25 Feb 2008
 Hairy dragonfly: Dumfries and Galloway Local Species Action Plan. 7 Mar. 2008. Dumfries and Galloway Council

References

External links
 Hairy dragonfly: LWT
 Hairy dragonfly: Dumfries and Galloway Local Species Action Plan

Dragonflies of Europe
Aeshnidae
Insects described in 1764